École Secondaire Esquimalt High School (or "EHS") is a high school located in Esquimalt, a township located west of  Victoria, British Columbia, Canada.  EHS is operated by the Greater Victoria School District.  It is the designated secondary school for Shoreline and Rockheights Middle Schools and serves students from Esquimalt, View Royal, and the Victoria neighbourhoods of Vic West and Craigflower.  The school is one of three to retain "High School" in its name when the Province of B.C. directed the change to "Secondary School". The school is served by the student-run newspaper Esquimalt Ink.

Academic programs
In addition to standard core curriculum programs, the following are offered:  
 Career Preparation Programs in Jazz, Media & Graphic Arts, Automotive Technology and Food Industry Training
 Culinary Arts
 4C Challenge Gifted Education (commitment to tasks; creative problem solving; challenging curriculum and assignments; and community involvement)
 Dramatic Arts
 Fine Arts
 Concert Band
 Jr. Jazz Ensemble
 Sr. Jazz Ensemble
 Concert Choir
 Vocal Ensemble
 Rhythm and Blues Band
 First Nations Education
 French Immersion
 Leadership
 Musical Theatre
 Improv
 Technology Education (woodworking, metalworking, electronics, automotive technology)
 Victoria International High School Programs

Athletics
The various athletics teams are known as the Esquimalt Dockers.
 Basketball
 Curling
 Rowing
 Rugby
 Swimming
 Wrestling
 Badminton
 Tennis

The Curling Academy focuses on developing a blend of skills including academic excellence, leadership development, and curling skills. The program accepts students from all levels of curling proficiency, including wheelchair curlers.

Weather Station
The University of Victoria operates a weather station at EHS as part of its School-Based Weather Station Network which gathers data from schools around Greater Victoria for its Climate Modelling Group of the School of Earth and Ocean Science.  The data is collected at the university and used to provide meteorological forecasts online.

Sustainability
The school is a participant in the Sustainable High Schools Project offered by the Sierra Club BC’s Environmental Education Program.

Notable alumni
 * Meg Tilly, actress, Broadway stage dancer, writer, and Academy Award nominee (attended in Grade 12, graduated Chief Sealth High School)

References

External links
 School District 61 Greater Victoria website
 UVic School-Based Weather Station Network
 Meg Tilly - IMDB biography
 Esquimalt Ink (school newspaper)
 Times Colonist 2009-06-19 article on Artour Sogomonian

High schools in Victoria, British Columbia
French-language schools in British Columbia

Educational institutions in Canada with year of establishment missing